Vital is a surname. Notable people with the surname include:
Albert Camille Vital (born 1952), Malagasy Army officer, politician and civil engineer
Arnaud Vital, a cobbler in the Comté de Foix in the early fourteenth century
Dinis Vital (1932–2014), Portuguese footballer
Francisco Vital (born 1954), Portuguese footballer and manager
Geymond Vital (1897–1987), French actor
Hayyim ben Joseph Vital (1542–1620), rabbi and Kabbalistic author
Joaquim Vital (1884–?), Portuguese wrestler
José Reginaldo Vital (born 1976), Brazilian footballer
Lionel Vital (born 1963), American football player
Mark Vital (born 1996), American basketball and football player
Martha Vital (born 1963), Mexican politician
Mateus Vital (born 1998), Brazilian footballerteam member
Pauleus Vital (1917–1984), Haitian artist
Raymonde Vital, a woman written about in the 1975 book Montaillou
Samuel Vital (1598–1677), Kabalist
Vital Cuinet (1833–1896), French geographer and orientalist
Yedidya Vital (born 1984), Israeli actor

See also 
Vital (disambiguation)